Twin Spits is a small unincorporated community in Kitsap County, Washington, United States. It is located within the Hansville CDP.

References

Unincorporated communities in Washington (state)
Unincorporated communities in Kitsap County, Washington

es:Bethel (condado de Kitsap, Washington)
vo:Bethel (Washington)